Indiana Buenting (born August 28, 1997), known professionally as Indiiana, is a Dutch-Dominican singer and songwriter, best known for featured appearances in the songs of Drenchill and  Heimlich.

Career 
Indiiana's debut was as featured singer on  "Sharks", created with Heimlich, which made it into 2 German charts: Dance-Charts and Deutsche Dj Playlist.

The second single of Indiiana was "Hey Hey" (a song by Drenchill with a guest performance by Indiiana), published by Sony Music. It came to German Dance-Charts with the highest position number 63. He was also on the Deutsche Dj Playlist list, where he was on position 10. Then Drenchill continued his collaboration with Indiiana.

Their next song was "Freed from Desire" (a cover of the single of the same name from Gala Rizzatto). In addition to the already mentioned lists and it was at number 1 on the Polish music charts AirPlay – Top list (it was the most popular single by Drenchill or Indiiana in Poland) and at number 4 on the Russian list (by Tophit).

In 2019 she recorded the song "Never Never" with Drenchill. It was the artists' most popular single in France and Belgium – she made it to the top of the Polish, Russian, German and French charts and to the tip of both Belgian charts (Ultratop 50 Singles from Flanders and Ultratop 50 Singles from Wallonia). This year she also appeared in the single We R Saints in the single "Shelter Me", but was unsuccessful.

In 2020 she recorded her next single – "Forever Summer" – with Drenchill. She was ranked 9th on the Polish list, 503rd in Russia, and he also made it onto two German lists: 3rd and 5th.

She also appeared in the single Nora & Chris and Perfect Pitch under the title "Staring at the sun". This song did not gain much popularity either.

Discography

Singles

As main artist

As featured artist

Music videos

References 

Colombian singer-songwriters
Colombian pop singers
21st-century Colombian women
Dutch women singer-songwriters
Dutch singer-songwriters
Dutch pop singers
21st-century Dutch women
21st-century Dutch singers
1998 births
Living people
21st-century Dutch women singers